= Adam Burj =

Adam Burj عدم برج
- Location within Pakistan
- Coordinates: 32.37°N 69.83°E
- Country: Pakistan
- Territory: Federally Administered Tribal Areas
- Elevation: 1,285 m (4,216 ft)
- Time zone: UTC+5 (PST)
  - Summer (DST): UTC+6 (PDT)

Adam Burj (Urdu: عدم برج) is a town in the Federally Administered Tribal Areas of Pakistan. It is located at 32°21'58N 69°49'52E with an altitude of 1285 metres (4219 feet).
